The election for Resident Commissioner to the United States House of Representatives took place on November 3, 1936, the same day as the larger Puerto Rican general election and the United States elections, 1936.

Candidates for Resident Commissioner
 J. A. López Antongiorgi for the Liberal Party
 Santiago Iglesias Pantín for the Republican Union

Election results

See also 
Puerto Rican general election, 1936

References 

1936
Puerto Rico
United States House of Representatives